The Hundred Days' Reform or Wuxu Reform was a failed 103-day national, cultural, political, and educational reform movement that occurred from 11 June to 22 September 1898 during the late Qing dynasty. It was undertaken by the young Guangxu Emperor and his reform-minded supporters. Following the issuing of the reformative edicts, a coup d'état ("The Coup of 1898", Wuxu Coup) was perpetrated by powerful conservative opponents led by Empress Dowager Cixi.

Beginning

China embarked on an effort to modernize, the Self-Strengthening Movement, following its defeat in the First (1839–1842) and Second (1856–1860) Opium Wars. The effort concentrated on providing the armed forces with modern weapons, rather than reforming governance or society. The limitations of this approach were exposed by the First Sino-Japanese War (1894–1895) when China was defeated by Meiji Japan, which had undergone comprehensive reforms during the same period. The defeat led to additional unequal treaties as European powers took advantage of China's weakness.

Elements of the Qing government were sufficiently alarmed to permit Kang Youwei and Liang Qichao to propose reforms to Emperor Guangxu; Guangxu agreed. Some of Kang's students were also given minor but strategic posts in the capital to assist with the reforms. The goals of these reforms included:

 abolishing the traditional examination system
 eliminating sinecures (positions that provided little or no work but provided a salary)
 establishing Peking University as a place where sciences, liberal arts and the Chinese classics would all be available for study
 establishing agricultural schools in all provinces and schools and colleges in all provinces and cities
 building a modern education system (studying mathematics and science instead of focusing mainly on Confucian texts)
 encouraging imperial family members to study abroad
 changing the government from an absolute monarchy to a constitutional monarchy
 applying principles of capitalism to strengthen the economy
 modernizing China's military and adopting modern training and drill methods
 establishing a naval academy
 utilizing unused military land for farming
 rapid industrialization of all of China through manufacturing, commerce, and capitalism
 establishing trade schools for the manufacture of silk, tea, and other traditional Chinese crafts
 establishing a bureau for railways and mines

The reformers declared that China needed more than "self-strengthening" and that innovation must be accompanied by institutional and ideological change.

Opposition to the reforms was intense among the conservative ruling elite who condemned it as too radical and proposed a more moderate and gradualist alternatives. Conservatives like Prince Duan suspected a foreign plot due to the introduction into the Qing government of foreign advisors like Timothy Richards and Ito Hirobumi; Duan wanted to expel foreigners completely from China.

In addition to the reforms, the reformers plotted to forcefully remove Empress Dowager Cixi from power. Tan Sitong asked Yuan Shikai to kill Ronglu, take control of the garrison at Tientsin, and then march on Beijing and arrest Cixi. However, Yuan had previously promised to support Ronglu; rather than kill him, Yuan informed Ronglu of the plot.

End
With the support of the conservatives and the armed forces commanded by Yuan and Ronglu, Cixi launched a coup d'état on September 22, 1898, and took over the government. Guangxu was put under house arrest in the Summer Palace until his death in 1908.

The reforms were reversed and their chief advocates - the "Six Gentlemen of Wuxu" (戊戌六君子): Tan Sitong, Kang Guangren (Kang Youwei's brother), Lin Xu, Yang Shenxiu, Yang Rui, and Liu Guangdi - were ordered to be executed. The two principal leaders, Kang Youwei and his student Liang Qichao, fled to Japan where they founded Baohuang Hui (Protect the Emperor Society) and worked, unsuccessfully, for a constitutional monarchy in China. Tan Sitong refused to flee and was executed.

During the Hundred Days' Reform, generals Dong Fuxiang, Ma Anliang, and Ma Haiyan were called to Beijing and helped put an end to the movement along with Ma Fulu and Ma Fuxiang. Dong Fuxiang and the Muslim Gansu Army stationed in Beijing during the Hundred Days' Reform later participated in the Boxer Rebellion and became known as the Kansu Braves.

Aftermath
The court put into effect some reform measures a decade later, starting with Cixi's New Policies. These included the abolition of the Imperial Examination in 1905, educational and military modernization patterned after the model of Japan, and an experiment in constitutional and parliamentary government. The suddenness and ambitiousness of the reform effort actually hindered its success. One effect, to be felt for decades to come, was the establishment of the New Army, which, in turn, gave rise to warlordism.

On the other hand, the failure of the reform movement gave great impetus to revolutionary forces within China. Changes within the establishment were seen to be largely hopeless, and the overthrow of the whole Qing government increasingly appeared to be the only viable way to save China. Such sentiments directly contributed to the success of the Xinhai Revolution in 1911, barely a decade later.

Leo Tolstoy corresponded with Gu Hongming on the Hundred Day's Reform and agreed that the reform movement was ill-advised.

Differing interpretations
Views of the Hundred Days' Reform have grown increasingly more complex and nuanced. The traditional view portrayed the reformers as heroes and the conservative elites, particularly the Empress Dowager Cixi, as villains unwilling to reform because of their selfish interests.

Failure as Kang's responsibility
However, some historians in the late 20th century have taken views that are more favorable to the conservatives and less favorable to the reformers. In this view, Kang Youwei and his allies were hopeless dreamers unaware of the political realities in which they operated. This view argues that the conservative elites were not opposed to change and that practically all of the reforms that were proposed were eventually implemented.

For example, Sterling Seagrave, in his book "The Dragon Lady", argues that there were several reasons why the reforms failed. Chinese political power at the time was firmly in the hands of the ruling Manchu nobility. The highly xenophobic iron hats faction dominated the Grand Council and were seeking ways to expel all Western influence from China. When implementing reform, the Guangxu Emperor by-passed the Grand Council and appointed four reformers to advise him. These reformers were chosen after a series of interviews, including the interview of Kang Youwei, who was rejected by the Emperor and had far less influence than Kang's later boasting would indicate. At the suggestion of the reform advisors, the Guangxu Emperor also held secret talks with former Japanese Prime Minister Itō Hirobumi with the aim of using his experience in the Meiji Restoration to lead China through similar reforms.

It has also been suggested, controversially, that Kang Youwei actually did a great deal of harm to the cause by his perceived arrogance in the eyes of the conservatives. Numerous rumors regarding potential repercussions, many of them false, had made their way to the Grand Council; this was one of the factors in their decision to stage a coup against the Emperor. Kang, like many of the reformers, grossly underestimated the reactionary nature of the vested interests involved.

The Emperor set about to enact his reforms by largely bypassing the powerful Grand Council; said councilors, irritated at the Emperor's actions and fearful of losing the political power they had, then turned to the Empress Dowager Cixi to remove the emperor from power. Many, though not all, of the reforms came to naught. The council, now confident in their power, pushed for the execution of the reformers, an action that was carried out ruthlessly.

Richard's federation theory
According to Professor Lei Chia-sheng (雷家聖), Japanese former prime minister Itō Hirobumi (伊藤博文) arrived in China on September 11, 1898, about the same time that Kang Youwei invited British missionary Timothy Richard to Beijing. Richard suggested that China appoint Itō as one of many foreign advisors in order to further push China's reform efforts. On September 18, Richard successfully convinced Kang to adopt his plan in which China would join a federation (合邦) of ten nations.

Kang nonetheless asked fellow reformers Yang Shenxiu (楊深秀) and Song Bolu (宋伯魯) to report this plan to the Guangxu Emperor. On September 20, Yang sent a memorial to the emperor to that effect. In another memorial to the Emperor written the next day, Song advocated the formation of a federation and the sharing of the diplomatic, fiscal, and military powers of the four countries under a hundred-man committee. Lei Chia-sheng argues that this idea was the reason why Cixi, who had just returned from the Summer Palace on September 19, decided to put an end to the reforms with the September 21 coup.

On October 13, following the coup, British ambassador Claude MacDonald reported to his government about the Chinese situation, claiming that Chinese reforms had been "much injured" by Kang and his friends' actions. However, the British and American governments had been largely unaware of the "federation" plot, which appears to have been Richard's own personal idea. The Japanese government might have been aware of Richard's plan, since his accomplice was the former Japanese prime minister, but there is no evidence to this effect yet.

See also
 History of China
 Qing dynasty
 Economy of China
 Economic history of China (Pre-1911)
 Economic history of China (1912–1949)

Notes

Further reading
 Hao, Chang. “Intellectual Changes and the Reform Movement, 1890–98,” 274–338, in The Cambridge History of China, vol 11 part 2, ed. Fairbank, John K. and Liu, Kwang-Ching. (Cambridge University Press, 1980).
 Hsü,  Immanuel C. The Rise of Modern China (6th edn, Oxford University Press 1999) pp 408–418.
 Hua, Shiping. "The Meiji Restoration (1868) and the Late Qing Reform (1898) Revisited: Strategies and Philosophies." East Asia 21.3 (2004): 3–22.
  Karl, Rebecca E. and Peter Gue Zarrow, eds., Rethinking the 1898 Reform Period: Political and Cultural Change in Late Qing China. (Harvard UP,  2002). .
 Kwong, Luke S. K. A Mosaic of the Hundred Days: Personalities, Politics, and Ideas of 1898. Cambridge, MA: Harvard University Press, 1984. .
 Kwong, Luke S. K.  "Chinese Politics at the Crossroads: Reflections on the Hundred Days Reform of 1898" Modern Asian Studies 34#3 (2000)  pp. 663–695 
 Li, ZongFang. "China’s Alternative: Kang Youwei’s Confucian Reforms in the Late Qing Dynasty." (2018). online
 Shan, Patrick Fuliang (2018). Yuan Shikai: A Reappraisal, The University of British Columbia Press. .
 Lei Chia-sheng 雷家聖 (2004). Liwan kuanglan: Wuxu zhengbian xintan 力挽狂瀾：戊戌政變新探 [Containing the furious waves: a new view of the 1898 coup]. Taipei: Wanjuan lou 萬卷樓. .

Boxer Rebellion
Economic history of China
1911 Revolution
1898 in China
Reform in China